Why Are You Lying, Elisabeth? (German: Warum lügst Du, Elisabeth?) is a 1944 German comedy film directed by Fritz Kirchhoff and starring Carola Höhn,  Paul Richter and Annie Rosar.  It was shot at the Tempelhof Studios in Berlin and on location in Vienna and Semmering in Austria. The film's sets were designed by the art director Carl Ludwig Kirmse.

Cast
 Carola Höhn as Elisabeth Ponholzer i.e.Lena Rodien
 Paul Richter as 	Lex Brandner, Caretaker at Lärchenhof
 Annie Rosar as 	Katrin , Cook
 Hansi Wendler as 	'Gaby' Gabriele Benzinger
 Walter Janssen as 	Leopold Dirk
 Gertrud Wolle as 	Walburga
 Erika Glässner as Clementine Soest
 Hans Adalbert Schlettow as 	Ernst Stadinger 
 Karl Skraup as 	Amtsvorsteher Stolp
 Heinz Himmel as Alois Kolbe
 Wilma Tatzel as Gretl	
 Ernst Reitter as Josef
 Stefanie Gutenthaler as 	Liesl

References

Bibliography
 Klaus, Ulrich J. Deutsche Tonfilme: Jahrgang 1944. Klaus-Archiv, 1988.
 Kreimeier, Klaus. The Ufa Story: A History of Germany's Greatest Film Company, 1918-1945. University of California Press, 1999.
 Rentschler, Eric. The Ministry of Illusion: Nazi Cinema and Its Afterlife. Harvard University Press, 1996.

External links 
 

1944 films
Films of Nazi Germany
German comedy films
1944 comedy films
1940s German-language films
German black-and-white films
1940s German films
Films directed by Fritz Kirchhoff
UFA GmbH films
Films shot in Austria
Films shot at Tempelhof Studios